Peshawar Waltz is a 1994 Russian action film directed and written by Timur Bekmambetov. The film is a dramatic depiction of Afghan war based on the actual events of the Badaber uprising of prisoners of war 24 km south of Peshawar, Pakistan. An English dub of the film titled Escape from Afghanistan was released on home video in 2002.

Plot summary
An American reporter and doctor (British and French in the original version) comes to a military base in Pakistan to document the P.O.W. conditions. While being there, the Soviet prisoners rise up and take over the base.

Awards
At the 29th Karlovy Vary International Film Festival, the film was nominated for the Crystal Globe and Timur Bekmambetov won the Best Director Award.

See also
 Badaber Uprising

References

External links 
 
 
 

1994 films
1994 action thriller films
Russian war drama films
Soviet–Afghan War films
Films set in Pakistan
1990s Russian-language films
Films directed by Timur Bekmambetov
1994 directorial debut films
Films produced by Roger Corman
Russian action thriller films